Branford High School is the only public high school in Branford, Florida, United States.

References

External links 
 
 Suwannee County School District, Suwannee County, FL

Schools in Suwannee County, Florida
Public high schools in Florida